Mount Field West is a mountain in the western portion of Mount Field National Park in the southern region of Tasmania, Australia.

The mountain is frequently snow-covered, sometimes even in summer. It is a major feature of the national park, and is a popular destination for bushwalkers. It overlooks Upper Florentine Valley and is a 7.5 hour return walk from Lake Dobson.

See also

 List of highest mountains of Tasmania

References

External links
 Mount Field National Park

Field, Mount